The Kararan orogeny was an orogenic event in the Gawler Craton of Western Australia during the Proterozoic between 1.57 and 1.55 billion years ago which reworked rocks metamorphosed during the Kimban orogeny.

See also
List of orogenies
Geology of Australia

References

Orogenies of Australia